Southern Edge vol. 1 was a compilation released in 1999.

Track listing 
 Jawbox - "Savory" - 4:42
 Webb Wilder - "Tough It Out" - 3:57
 Meat Puppets - "Sam" - 3:10
 Ben Folds Five - "Jackson Cannery" - 3:26
 The Reverend Horton Heat - "Time to Pray" - 2:42
 Agents of Good Roots - "Miss America" - 3:02
 Doug Hoekstra - "Sam Cooke Sang the Gospel" - 4:45
 The Jayhawks - "Blue" (live) - 3:14
 Better Than Ezra - "Southern Gürl" - 4:08
 Cake - "Rock and Roll Lifestyle" - 4:16
 The Reverend Horton Heat - "Slow" - 4:26
 Southern Culture on the Skids - "White Trash" - 2:06
 Man...or Astroman - "Manta Ray" - 2:18

References

1999 compilation albums
Indie rock compilation albums